Sir Richard Claverhouse Jebb  (27 August 1841 – 9 December 1905) was a British classical scholar.

Life

Jebb was born in Dundee, Scotland. His father Robert was a well-known Irish barrister; his mother was Emily Harriet Horsley, daughter of the Reverend Heneage Horsley, Dean of Brechin. His grandfather Richard Jebb was a judge of the Court of King's Bench (Ireland). His sister was the social reformer Eglantyne Louisa Jebb, founder of the Home Arts and Industries Association; his niece, Eglantyne's daughter Eglantyne Jebb, co-founded the Save the Children Fund and wrote the Declaration of the Rights of the Child.

He was educated at St Columba's College, Dublin 1853–55 then Charterhouse School 1855–1858. He then studied Classics at Trinity College, Cambridge. 

He was a Member of the Cambridge Apostles, the intellectual secret society, from 1859. He won the Porson and Craven scholarships, was senior classic in 1862, and became fellow and tutor of his college in 1863. From 1869 to 1875, he was public orator of Cambridge University; Professor of Greek at Glasgow from 1875 to 1889, and Regius Professor of Greek at Cambridge from 1889 until his death. His successor was Henry Jackson. He was elected a Fellow of the British Academy in 1902. In 1891 Jebb was elected Member of Parliament for Cambridge University; he was knighted in 1900. Jebb was acknowledged to be one of the most brilliant classical scholars of his time, a humanist and an unsurpassed translator from and into the classical languages. A collected volume, Translations into Greek and Latin, appeared in 1873 (ed. 1909). He received many honorary degrees from European and American universities, including when in May 1902 he was at Caernarfon to receive the honorary degree DLitt (Doctor of Letters) from the University of Wales during the ceremony to install the Prince of Wales (later King George V) as Chancellor of that university. 

In 1904, he was elected as a member to the American Philosophical Society. In 1905, he was made a member of the Order of Merit.

Jebb married Caroline Lane Reynolds, daughter of Reverend John Reynolds, on 18 August 1874; Caroline Lane Reynolds was born in 1840 in Evansburg, Pennsylvania. She was married in 1856 to US Army Lieutenant Adam J. Slemmer and the couple lived at military outposts in South Carolina, Florida, and Wyoming Territory. After his death in 1868, she lived briefly in Cambridge, England, and was visiting Paris at the outbreak of the Franco-Prussian War. 

In 1874, she married Richard Claverhouse Jebb and joined social circles embracing George Eliot, Alfred Lord Tennyson, Charles Darwin, Mark Twain, and Bret Harte. His wife was a member of the Ladies Dining Society in Cambridge, with 11 other members.
 
He died at his home, Springfield House in Cambridge, on 9 December 1905 and was buried at the St Giles Cemetery (now known as the Parish of the Ascension Burial Ground) in Cambridge.

His wife died and was cremated in America, but her ashes were interred in his Cambridge grave.

Works

The most important of Jebb's publications are:
 The Characters of Theophrastus (1870), text, introduction, English translation and commentary (re-edited by JE Sandys, 1909)
 The Attic Orators from Antiphon to Isaeus (2nd ed., 1893), with companion volume, Selections from the Attic Orators (2nd ed, 1888)
 Bentley (1882)
 Sophocles (3rd ed., 1893) the seven plays, text, English translation and notes, the promised edition of the fragments being prevented by his death
 Bacchylides (1905), text, translation, and notes
 Homer (3rd ed., 1888), an introduction to the Iliad and Odyssey
 Modern Greece (1901)
 The Growth and Influence of Classical Greek Poetry (1893).

His translation of the Rhetoric of Aristotle was published posthumously under the editorship of J. E. Sandys (1909). A selection from his Essays and Addresses, and a subsequent volume, Life and Letters of Sir Richard Claverhouse Jebb (with critical introduction by A. W. Verrall) were published by his widow in 1907; see also an appreciative notice by J. E. Sandys, History of Classical Scholarship, iii. (1908).

The Archives and Special Collections at Amherst College holds a collection of his papers.

Notes

References

External links
 
 
 Richard Claverhouse Jebb Papers at the Amherst College Archives & Special Collections
 
 
 
 
 British Academy Fellowship entry
 Trinity College Chapel

1841 births
1905 deaths
People from Dundee
People educated at Charterhouse School
Alumni of Trinity College, Cambridge
Fellows of Trinity College, Cambridge
British classical scholars
Fellows of the British Academy
Fellows of the Royal Society of Edinburgh
Members of the Order of Merit
Cambridge University Orators
Knights Bachelor
Conservative Party (UK) MPs for English constituencies
Members of the Parliament of the United Kingdom for the University of Cambridge
UK MPs 1886–1892
UK MPs 1892–1895
UK MPs 1895–1900
UK MPs 1900–1906
Regius Professors of Greek (Cambridge)
Classical scholars of the University of Glasgow
Scholars of ancient Greek literature
Translators of Ancient Greek texts
Members of the American Philosophical Society